This is a list of Danish television related events from 1959.

Events
12 February - Birthe Wilke is selected to represent Denmark at the 1959 Eurovision Song Contest with her song "Uh, jeg ville ønske jeg var dig". She is selected to be the third Danish Eurovision entry during Dansk Melodi Grand Prix held at the Radiohouse in Copenhagen.

Debuts

Television shows

Ending this year

Births

Deaths

See also
 1959 in Denmark